Cyfronydd railway station lies 5 3/4 miles or  from Welshpool's Raven Square station on the narrow gauge Welshpool and Llanfair Light Railway in Mid Wales. This is where trains pass each other when a two train service is operating. Passengers are able to alight and join trains here. The station serves the hamlet of Cyfronydd on the main Dolgellau to Welshpool road as well as Cyfronydd Hall.

Cyfronydd Hall, where former Foreign Secretary William Hague lives, is nearby.

Opened on 6 April 1903 it was closed to passengers on 9 February 1931. It was the Great Western Railway that withdrew passenger services in 1931. and the line closed completely on 3 November 1956.

Notes

References 
 
 Rushton, Gordon (2015). The Welshpool & Llanfair Railway  Travellers's Guide. Llanfair Caereinion : Welshpool & Llanfair Railway.

External links
 Video footage of Cyfronydd Station
 3 minutes from Welshpool to Llanfair Caereinion

Welshpool and Llanfair Light Railway
Heritage railway stations in Powys
Former Cambrian Railway stations
Railway stations in Great Britain opened in 1903
Railway stations in Great Britain closed in 1931
Railway stations in Great Britain opened in 1963